Indonesian theatre is a type of art in the form of drama performances that are staged on a stage, with a distinct Indonesian nuance or background. In general, theatre is an art that emphasizes the performing arts that are displayed in front of a large crowd. In other words, theater is a form of visualisation of a drama that is staged on the stage and watched by the audience. Indonesian theatre includes the performing arts of traditional theater and modern theatre located in the territory of Indonesia (also called Nusantara). Some examples of Indonesian theater are Arja, Wayang, Wayang wong, Lenong, Ludruk, Janger, Randai and others. Theatre in Indonesia can also be referred to as regional or ethnic theatre, because it originates and develops from 1,300 ethnic cultures in Indonesia.

History

Theatre performances in Indonesia have been going on for thousands of years. Most of Indonesia's oldest theatre forms are linked directly to local literary traditions (oral and written). The prominent puppet theatres — wayang golek (wooden rod-puppet play) of the Sundanese and wayang kulit (leather shadow-puppet play) of the Javanese and Balinese—draw much of their repertoire from indigenized versions of the Ramayana and Mahabharata. These tales also provide source material for the wayang wong (human theatre) of Java and Bali, which uses actors. Some wayang golek performances, however, also present Muslim stories, called menak. Theories about the origin of theater in Indonesia are divided as follows:

 Derived from local religious ceremonies. A narrative element is added to such ceremonies which eventually develop into theater performances. Although religious ceremonies have long been abandoned, this theater is still alive today.
 Derived from chants in honor of a hero at his grave. In this event, someone tells the story of the hero's life, which has been shown in the form of the theater.
 Derived from the human penchant for listening to stories. The story was later also made in the form of a theater (tales of hunting, heroism, war, etc.).

Type  
In Indonesia, the types of theater can be divided into two forms of presentation. The two types of Indonesian theatre are known as Teater tradisional (Traditional Theatre) and Teater Modern (Non-Traditional Theatre).

Traditional theatre

Traditional theatre is often referred to as "Regional Theater" (Indonesian: Teater daerah). This traditional theatre is a form of theatre that is rooted, sourced and felt as belonging to the community in its environment. This theater processing is based on the taste of the supporting community.  This traditional theater has specific regional characteristics and depicts the cultural form in its environment.

The main characteristics of Traditional Theatre are;
 Using local languages,
 There is an element of song and dance,
 Accompanied by tetabuhan (regional music),
 There is intimacy between the players and the audience
 Relaxed atmosphere.

Types of theater that can be categorized into traditional theater are;  Folk Theater, Classical Theater, Transitional Theater.

Folk theatre

Folk theatre (Indonesian: Teater rakyat) is born spontaneously in people's lives, is lived and develops according to the development of the community. Folk theatre was born because of the people's need for entertainment, then it was increasingly used for other purposes such as the need to fill traditional ceremonies.

The types of folk theater that exist in the territory of Indonesia, including;

 Jakarta : Lenong, Topeng Betawi, .
 Banten : Debus, Ubrug.
 Central Java : Bambangan cakil, Ronggeng, Srandul Ketoprak, Wayang Purwa, Wayang beber, Wayang wong.
 East Java : Ludruk, Topeng Malangan, Reog Ponorogo, Wayang Kulit, Wayang Gambuh, Kentrungan, Calonarang.
 West Java : Ujungan, Sempyong, Angklung Sered, Buncis, Dodombaan, Kuda Renggong, Sisingaan, Manorek, Ronggeng Gunung, Surak Ibra, Masres, Akrobat, Uyeg, Topeng Cisalak, Wayang Bekasi, Topeng Banjet, Odong-odong, Longser, Sandiwara Sunda, Wayang Golek, Pantun Sunda, Bengbengberokan, Topeng Cirebon, Sintren.
 Riau : Mendu, Bangsawan and Mak yong.
 West Sumatra : Bakaba, Randai.
 Kalimantan : Tatayungan, Mamanda, Topeng Banjar
 Bali : Arja, Topeng Cupak, Topeng Prembon.
 Sulawesi : Sinrilli.

Classical theatre

Classical theatre (Indonesian: Teater klasik) is a theatre development that has reached a high level both in style and technique. Establishment of this type of classical theater as a result of continuous formation from the top such as; Raja, sultan, aristocrats or other high social ranks. Therefore, most classical arts were born in the palace environment (the center of the kingdom). Theater which is included in the classical theater types include; Wayang Golek (West Java), Wayang Kulit and Wayang Wong (Central Java and East Java).

Classical theatre performance is no longer limited to folk theatre. Classical theater must comply with the ethical (politeness) and aesthetic (beauty values) rules that have been outlined.

Transition theatre
Transitional theatre (Indonesian: Teater transisi) is basically based on traditional theater as well, but the style of performance has already acquired western theatre influences. The influence of western theater can be seen in the way it is presented. Although this transitional theater is still not loyal to theater scripts, because it grows and develops in urban communities and is played by migrants, this theater does not fully reflect the aspirations of the community.

Included in the type of transitional theater in the early days, such as; Dardanella and the comedy skit Stambul. This kind of theater is more commonly called "Sandiwara". Meanwhile, the current transitional theater is; Bangsawan (South Sumatra and North Sumatra), Sandiwara sunda (West Java), Srimulat plays (East Java).

Modern theatre
Modern theatre or other terms is non-traditional theater which is a type of theater that grows and develops in urban communities and is influenced by western theories, especially scholars.  Since the 19th century, Indonesia has been familiar with this modern theater. The forms of the performances are very accommodated, among others; read Poetry, Poetry Visualization, Poetry Musicalization, Declamation, Dramatic Reading, Monologue, Conventional Theater, Experimental Theater, Alternative Theater, Street Theater, Jeprut, Happening Art, Postmodernism Shows, Television Drama, Soap operas, World of Films and Films.

The form of modern theater performances tends to be more organized. Stage or Stage is always the choice as a venue for performances. In its development, modern theater performances sometimes try to return to the roots of tradition. This means that adjusting the place of the show according to the director's wishes about how the story is performed, it can be in an open space or a closed place.

List of theatre in Indonesia

Wayang

Wayang is a traditional form of puppet theatre play originated on the Indonesian island of Java. Wayang kulit is a unique form of theatre employing light and shadow. The puppets are crafted from buffalo hide and mounted on bamboo sticks. When held up behind a piece of white cloth, with an electric bulb or an oil lamp as the light source, shadows are cast on the screen. The plays are typically based on romantic tales and religious legends, especially adaptations of the classic epics, the Mahabharata and the Ramayana. Some of the plays are also based on local stories like Panji tales.

Wayang wong

Wayang wong, also known as wayang orang (literally "human wayang"), is a type of classical Javanese dance theatrical performance with themes taken from episodes of the Ramayana or Mahabharata. The bas relief panels on the 9th-century of Prambanan temple show episodes of the Ramayana epic. The adaptation of Mahabharata episodes has been integrated in the Javanese literature tradition since the Kahuripan and Kediri era, with notable examples such as Arjunawiwaha, composed by Mpu Kanwa in the 11th century. The Penataran temple in East Java depicts themes from the Ramayana and Mahabharata in its bas reliefs. The Javanese dance drama associated with wayang's epic themes from the Ramayana and Mahabharata would have existed by then. Wayang wang was a performance in the style of wayang kulit (the shadow theatre of Central Java) wherein actors and actresses took the puppets' roles. The first written reference to the form is on the stone inscription Wimalarama from East Java dated 930 CE. The genre is currently done in masked and unmasked variations in Central Java, Bali, and Cirebon, as well as in Sundanese (West Java). Wayang wong is closely associated with Indonesian culture.

Topeng

Topeng (Indonesian for "mask") is a dramatic form of Indonesian dance theatre in which one or more mask-wearing. Indonesian masked dance predates Hindu-Buddhist influences. Native Indonesian tribes still perform traditional masked-dances to represent nature, as the Hudoq dance of the Dayak people of Kalimantan, or to represent ancestor spirits. With the arrival of Hinduism in the archipelago, the Ramayana and Mahabharata epics began to be performed in masked-dance. The most popular storyline of topeng dance, however, derived from the locally developed Javanese Panji cycles, based on the tales and romance of Prince Panji and Princess Chandra Kirana, set in the 12th-century Kadiri kingdom.

Ketoprak

Ketoprak is a theatrical genre of Java featuring actors who may also sing to the accompaniment of the gamelan. The show were performed in certain period in an empty plain near a village and moved from one place to another, in fashion similar to western travelling circus. In this traveling troupe, the performers and staffs also brought show properties; such as costumes, stage decorations, chairs, gamelan, sound system, diesel electric generator, all were contained in a portable building that also used as set or stage called "tobong". During their journey, the troupe members also living in this tobong.
Recently ketoprak has been adopted into television show, the "Ketoprak Humor" show was aired in Indonesian national television. It is a comedy and action performance, often took place in modern settings or in historical ancient Javanese kingdoms. The ketoprak that took the story of ancient Java is quite similar with Wayang wong performance, however ketoprak performance is more free for improvisations.

Randai

Randai is a folk theater tradition of the Minangkabau ethnic group in West Sumatra, Indonesia, which incorporates music, singing, dance, drama and the martial art of Silat. Randai performances are a synthesis of alternating martial arts dances, songs, and acted scenes. Stories are delivered by both the acting and the singing and are mostly based upon Minangkabau legends and folktales.

Lenong

Lenong is a traditional theatrical form of the Betawi people in Jakarta, Indonesia. Lenong developed from the earlier form Gambang Rancag. Lenong is a form of theatre traditional to the Betawi people. Dialogue is generally in the Betawi dialect. Actions and dialogue are often presented in a humorous manner on top of a stage known as a pentas tapal kuda, so named for the way actors enter the stage from the left and right. Audiences sit in front of the stage. The number of performers is determined by the needs of the story. Male performers are referred to as panjak, while female performers are known as ronggeng.

Arja

Arja is a popular form of Balinese theatre which combines elements of opera, dance, and drama.

The word Arja can be interpreted as beautiful, charming, or harmonious. At first, Arja was only performed by men, but in the 1920s a group of Arja played by women appeared in Tapean Village, Klungkung. They broke regulations that prohibited women from appearing in public. In 1925 the Arja Rabi-Rabi group appeared in Singapadu and Puri Ubud, which all consisted of the king's wives or the wives of the royal family. In 1945 a group of sekeha arja (sekeha sebunan) emerged, consisting of men and women in Batuan Village, Gianyar. Around the 1990s, the Arja group, all of which were male, emerged again, named Arja Muani Printing Mas. The history of its journey is similar to that of the gandrung art in Banyuwangi which was originally played by men then changed entirely by women, then again the gandrung dance performed by all men. The difference is that the Gandrung dance is not performed by men and women in pairs.

Arja's performance art plays were originally Panji stories, then developed by taking stories from chronicles, folk tales, wayang, and nowadays sometimes everyday stories. The tightness of the performances made Arja's groups overwhelmed with the play, because not all of them were able to work on the story in a short time. In the end, they only made compositions from existing stories, so that the names of the groups followed the plays that were often played, such as Arja Pakang Raras, Arja Basur, Arja Jayaprana, and Arja Sampik. However, Panji's story is closely related to Arja's art, making the characters of Panji characters always present in each of his performances.

Barong

Barong is a style of traditional Balinese and Javanese dance theatre from Bali and Java. The dance demonstrates about the mythological depiction of animals that have supernatural powers and could protect humans. Barong is the king of the spirits, leader of the hosts of good, and enemy of Rangda, the demon queen and mother of all spirit guarders in the mythological traditions of Bali. The Barong dance featured battle between Barong and Rangda to represent the eternal battle between good and evil.

Reog

Reog is a traditional Indonesian dance theatre in an open arena that serves as folk entertainment, contains magical elements, the main dancer is a lion-headed person with a peacock feather decoration, plus several masked dancers and Kuda Lumping. The dance describe Klono Sewandono the king of Ponorogo on his journey to Kediri to seek the hands of Princess Songgo Langit. On his journey he was attacked by a vicious monster called Singo Barong, a mythical lion with peacock on its head. Historians trace the origin of Reog Ponorogo as the satire on the incompetence of Majapahit rulers during the end of the empire. It describe the innate Ponorogo liberty and its opposition on centralist Majapahit rule. The lion represent the king of Majapahit while the peafowl represent the queen, it was suggested that the king was incompetent and always being controlled by his queen. The beautiful, youthful and almost effeminate horsemen describe the Majapahit cavalry that have lost their manliness.

See also

 Culture of Indonesia

References

Theatre in Indonesia
Traditional drama and theatre of Indonesia